Stockhorn Arena (formerly known as Arena Thun) is a football stadium in Thun, Switzerland. It has a capacity of 10,000 spectators and opened in 2011.  It is the home of FC Thun of the Swiss Super League.

History
From 1954 until 2011, Stadion Lachen was the home ground of Swiss side FC Thun. In the early 2000s, however, the Swiss Football League claimed that the old stadium did not meet the minimal stadium requirements and that it was no longer fit for football in the highest division. The club received an exemption to play at the Lachen for a few more years, but was asked either to renovate extensively or to build a new stadium.

In 2006, the citizens of Thun refused to finance a new stadium with public funds, leaving FC Thun in a bind: without a new stadium the club would be ineligible to play professionally. General contractor HRS offered to finance a new stadium, with a shopping center on the same area (the Panorama Center), located 1.8 km northwest of Stadion Lachen. In 2007 the contracts were signed, and the construction work began in spring 2010. The new stadium - at that time called Arena Thun - was officially inaugurated on 9 July 2011, with a friendly match between 1. FC Köln and FC Thun. Köln's striker Milivoje Novaković was the first player to score in the new arena (5'), and the game ended in a tie (2:2).

In February 2014, the Arena Thun AG (operator of the stadium) sold the naming rights to a new main sponsor/partner: Stockhornbahn AG (which runs an aerial cableway to the Stockhorn). The stadium was renamed Stockhorn Arena at that time, with an official ceremony held on 12 April 2014, on the occasion of the match between FC Aarau and FC Thun.

Structure
The stadium is located near the A6 motorway, close to the exit Thun Süd, approximately 2 km west from downtown Thun and the railway station. The Stockhorn Arena, with a capacity of 10,000, is equipped with artificial turf (KR FIFA-2-Star-certified).

International matches

Men's national teams

Women's national teams

Other teams
From time to time matches of the Switzerland national under-21 football team are also held at the Stockhorn Arena.

Gallery

References

Football venues in the Canton of Bern
FC Thun
Sports venues in the Canton of Bern
Sports venues completed in 2011
21st-century architecture in Switzerland